The Tatuus FT-60 is an open-wheel formula race car, designed, developed and built by Italian manufacturer Tatuus that has been used in the Toyota Racing Series since 2020.

The vehicle is equipped with a Toyota engine which has also more displacement than the Alfa Romeo and Renault Sport engines used in the Tatuus F.3 T-318 and Tatuus FR-19 race cars.

After the cancellation of the 2022 Toyota Racing Series, the cars were loaned to the W Series for the races in Barcelona and Singapore in order to reduce the transport costs of delivering Tatuus F.3 T-318 cars.

References

External links
 Tatuus website

Open wheel racing cars
Toyota Racing Series
Cars introduced in 2020